The Kohat Brigade (now 101 Infantry Brigade, Sialkot, Pakistan) was formed after the 1903 reforms of the British Indian Army by Herbert Kitchener when he was Commander-in-Chief, India. The brigade was part of the Northern Army and deployed along the North West Frontier. In 1914 at the start of World War I the brigade formation was:

Commander Major General A Campbell
31st Duke of Connaught's Own Lancers
53rd Sikhs (Frontier Force)
54th Sikhs (Frontier Force)
56th Punjabi Rifles (Frontier Force)
122nd Rajputana Infantry
31st Mountain Battery
Frontier Force Garrison Artillery

See also

 List of Indian Army Brigades in World War II

References

Bibliography

Brigades of India in World War I
Military units and formations established in 1903